Lyonpo Kinzang Dorji (born 19 February 1951) is a two-time former Prime Minister of Bhutan from 2002 to 2003 and again from 2007 to 2008. He was the chairman of Royal Monetary Authority of Bhutan from 2007 to 2008.

He was the speaker of the National Assembly from 1997 to 2000.

Dorji served as Prime Minister from August 14, 2002 to August 30, 2003. He was Minister of Works and Human Settlement before being sworn in as Prime Minister again, in a caretaker capacity, on August 2, 2007. This followed the resignations of Prime Minister Khandu Wangchuk and other ministers, who intended to stand in the 2008 general election. Following the election, held in March 2008, Dorji was succeeded by Jigme Thinley on April 9, 2008.

References

|-

1951 births
Living people
People from Mongar District
Prime Ministers of Bhutan
Kinzang Dorji
Speakers of the National Assembly (Bhutan)
Infrastructures ministers of Bhutan